

Welsh Football League Division Three 

This league known as the Nathanielcars.co.uk Welsh League Division Three for sponsorship reasons, is a football league in Wales. This is the third division of football in South Wales and the fourth tier of the Welsh Football League.

The reigning champions are Cardiff Corinthians.

Promotion and relegation 

New Teams entered into this League
 Barry Town United
 Llanelli Town
 Lliswerry
 Cwmamman United
 Rhoose
 Bettws

Teams relegated from 2012–13 Welsh Football League Division Two
 None

Stadia and locations

League table

Notes

References 
 http://www.welshleague.org.uk/index.htm
 http://www.welshleague.org.uk/results.htm

Welsh Football League Division Three seasons
4
Wales